Philip Courtenay may refer to:

Philip Courtenay (died 1406) of Powderham
Philip Courtenay (died 1463) of Powderham
Philip Courtenay (died 1488) of the Manor of Molland, Devon; or his descendants Philip Courtenay (died 1548) and Philip Courtenay (died 1611)
 Philip Courtenay, British Conservative MP for Bridgwater 1837–1841
Philip of Courtenay (1243–1283), Emperor of Constantinople